Nicholas Surtees (20 January 1977) is a former professional rugby league footballer who played in the 2000s. He played at representative level for Scotland, and at club level for the St Albans Centurions.

Background
Surtees was born in Auckland, New Zealand.

International honours
Surtees won caps for Scotland while at St Albans Centurions in 2005 against Wales (sub), and Ireland (sub).

References

Living people
New Zealand people of Scottish descent
New Zealand rugby league players
Rugby league players from Auckland
Scotland national rugby league team players
St Albans Centurions players
1977 births